Al-Lubban may refer to:

 Al-Lubban al-Gharbi, a Palestinian village in Ramallah Governorate
 Al-Lubban ash-Sharqiya, a Palestinian village in Nablus Governorate

See also
 Al Lubban, town in Jordan